The term Three Valleys means either: 
The English name for a ski resort in the French Alps, Les Trois Vallées, or
A water company in the United Kingdom, Three Valleys Water plc